Barberà Rookies is an American football team based in Barberà del Vallès, Spain.

Honours
 Catalan League: (2): 2007, 2010

External links
Official website

American football teams established in 2002
2002 establishments in Spain
American football teams in Catalonia